Hum Naujawan is a 1985 Indian drama film directed by Dev Anand. He himself played the central character in the film dedicated to young students. It marked the debut of Richa Sharma, Tabu, Bunty Behl and Atlee Brar with Anupam Kher and Shreeram Lagoo, among others, playing lead roles. The music was composed by R. D. Burman.

Plot
Professor Hans joins as new principal of Oceanic College. His teenaged daughter Priya is raped and killed. He finds clues pointing towards a college student, Shammi, who is the son of the Home Minister, Desai. The Police Commissioner Khan is informed but he is unable to take any action against the minister's son. Rashmi and Sanjay, students in the college, help Prof Hans as together they trick Shammi into confessing to his crime.

Cast
 Dev Anand as Professor Hans Raj
 Richa Sharma as Rashmi
 Attley Brar as Shammi
 Tabu as Priya
 Bunty Behl as Sanjay
 Anupam Kher as Commissioner Sajid Khan
 Zarina Wahab as School Teacher Meenakshi
 Shreeram Lagoo as Home Minister Kamlesh Desai
 Ramesh Deo as Principal Dinesh Verma
 Pinchoo Kapoor as College Trustee 1
 Bharat Kapoor as College Trustee 2
 Dinesh Hingoo as a Professor
 Tabassum as Professor Batliwala
 Mohan Sherry

Soundtrack
Lyrics: Anjaan

External links

References

1980s Hindi-language films
1985 films
Films directed by Dev Anand
Films scored by R. D. Burman